Jamsil Indoor Swimming Pool is an aquatics venue located in Seoul, South Korea. It hosted the swimming, diving, water polo, synchronized swimming, and the swimming part of the modern pentathlon events at the 1988 Summer Olympics. The venue was constructed from November 1977 to December 1980 and has a seating capacity of 8,000.

References
1988 Summer Olympics official report. Volume 1. Part 1. p. 164.

Venues of the 1988 Summer Olympics
Indoor arenas in South Korea
Olympic diving venues
Olympic modern pentathlon venues
Olympic swimming venues
Olympic synchronized swimming venues
Olympic water polo venues
Sports venues in Seoul
Sports venues completed in 1980
1980 establishments in South Korea
Venues of the 1986 Asian Games
Asian Games diving venues
Asian Games swimming venues
Asian Games water polo venues
20th-century architecture in South Korea